Ahrue Ilustre (born \September 17, 1978), commonly known as Ahrue Luster, is an American heavy metal guitarist. He is a current guitarist of American heavy metal band Lions at the Gate, and was the lead guitarist for the heavy metal band Ill Niño. He is also a former guitarist for Machine Head, as well as Manmade God and a Bay Area thrash metal act called The Horde of Torment who were originally called "Pestilence" but had to change their name because another Pestilence had signed to Roadrunner Records.

In 2015, Luster joined the horror metal band Terror Universal founded by Ill Niño drummer Dave Chavarri. He produced Motograter's second studio album, which has been released on August 11, 2017.

In September 2019, Nonpoint announced Luster will be their touring lead guitarist for their upcoming tour.

Discography

Machine Head
The Burning Red (1999)
Supercharger (2001)
Hellalive (2003)

Ill Niño
Confession (2003)
One Nation Underground (2005)
The Under Cover Sessions (2006)
Enigma (2008)
Dead New World (2010)
Epidemia (2012)
Till Death, La Familia (2014)

References

1968 births
Ill Niño members
Living people
Alternative metal guitarists
American musicians of Filipino descent
American people of German descent
American people of Italian descent
American people of Finnish descent
Machine Head (band) members